Markus Peter Leminen (born 14 October 1975 in Vantaa) is a Finnish former figure skater who competed in men's singles. He is a six-time Finnish national champion. He coaches at the Bradford District Skating Club in Bradford, Ontario, Canada.

Programs

Results
GP: Champions Series/Grand Prix

References

External links
 
 Markus Leminen's official page

Navigation

1975 births
Sportspeople from Vantaa
Finnish male single skaters
Living people
Finnish expatriate sportspeople in Canada